Aditya Sarwate (born 10 December 1989) is an Indian cricketer who plays for Vidarbha. He made his first-class debut on 22 October 2015 in the 2015–16 Ranji Trophy. He was the leading wicket-taker for Vidarbha in the group-stage of the 2018–19 Ranji Trophy, with 38 dismissals in eight matches. In the final of the 2018–19 Ranji Trophy, Sarwate took eleven wickets in the match,  and was named the Player of the Match. 

In August 2019, he was named in the India Red team's squad for the 2019–20 Duleep Trophy.

References

External links
 

1989 births
Living people
Indian cricketers
Vidarbha cricketers
Cricketers from Nagpur